Belphegor is an Austrian extreme metal band from Salzburg. They originally formed in 1991 under the name Betrayer before changing their name in 1993, deriving their current name from the demon Belphegor.

History

Early years (1991–1997)
Belphegor was founded as Betrayer in 1991 by vocalist and bassist Maxx, guitarists Helmuth and Sigurd, and drummer Chris. The band released their first demo Kruzifixion in April 1991, and Unborn Blood later on. After adopting the name Belphegor in 1993, they released another demo, Bloodbath in Paradise on Maxi-CD format. At somepoint before or after the release of this demo, Maxx departed from the band, resulting in Helmuth assuming his role as both vocalist and guitarist of Belphegor since. In between 1993 and 1996 session member A-X performed bass, after which bassist Mario "Marius" Klausner joined the band as a full-time member.

The band was briefly signed to Perverted Taste Records, the label on which the demo Obscure and Deep was released in 1994. This release featured a cover of the Black Sabbath song "Sabbath Bloody Sabbath". Their first album, The Last Supper, was released by Lethal Records in January 1995. At this time the band's logo was also redesigned to include two inverted crosses surrounded by blood.

Last Episode and Phallelujah Productions (1997–2002)
The band's second album Blutsabbath  was released in October 1997, featuring Man (of Mastic Scum) on session drums. This was followed by an eighteen date tour of Europe in April and May 1998 with Behemoth and Ancient. The band's debut album The Last Supper was rereleased in 1999 and came clad in all new artwork and featured an additional six extra tracks from the Obscure And Deep EP.

The following year, the third album Necrodaemon Terrorsathan was released by Last Episode (nowadays known as Black Attakk), where Man again performed session drums. The band eventually left Last Episode and later denounced them as a "rip-off label". In January 2001, Belphegor headlined a few shows at outdoor venues at 'Fuck The Commerce IV', 'With Full Force VIII' and 'Hell On Earth' in Germany with support from Dunkelgrafen and Dawn of Dreams. In 2002, Belphegor played at the Summerbreeze, Brutal Assault and Morbide Festspiele prior to further German gigs in December. It was also around then when Belphegor first recruited drummer Torturer (Mor Dagor) and bassist Barth. After releasing their live album Infernal Live Orgasm on their own label Phallelujah Productions, they signed with Napalm Records.

Napalm Records (2003–2005)
After having signed up with Napalm Records, the lineup of vocalist and guitarist Helmuth, guitarist Sigurd, bassist Barth and drummer Torturer recorded the fourth album Lucifer Incestus, produced by Alex Krull of Atrocity. The album was released in December 2003, and a European tour followed.

Belphegor entered Mastersound Studio in Fellbach during September 2004 record their fifth album Goatreich - Fleshcult, again produced by Alex Krull. The band undertook a mini-tour in November with Disastrous Murmur, and played at the X-Mass Festival alongside Napalm Death, Marduk, Finntroll and Vader. In February 2005, Goatreich - Fleshcult was released in various formats, including a vinyl edition limited to 1000 copies. Digipack variants added the instrumental track 'Heresy Of Fire' as a bonus. That same month, drummer Torturer left the band and was replaced by Nefastus (Tomas Janiszewski). In April, Belphegor headlined the eighteen-day Goatreich - Fleshcult Europe Tour Pt. I with support from Arkhon Infaustus, Asmodeus and In Aeternum. The band soon departed from Napalm Records, on the grounds the label "did not support them enough" and they were "fed up with this respectless treatment."

Early years with Nuclear Blast (2005–2009)

Belphegor signed with Nuclear Blast in 2005, and commenced recording the album Pestapokalypse VI in producer Andy Classen's (who also produced the band's debut album The Last Supper) Stage One Studios in November.

After having played bass on six of the nine tracks on the new album, bassist Barth was forced to leave the band and terminate his career after suffering a hand injury that left him unable to continue performing. This led to Belphegor withdrawing from a tour with Hate Eternal in April 2006, and Helmuth was forced to record the remaining bass lines on the new album himself while Robin Eaglestone (ex-Cradle of Filth, Imperial Black) was recruited as a session bassist for live performances between April and October. Barth's full-time replacement was Serpenth, who joined the band in October.

Pestapokalypse VI was released in October 2006, and drummer Nefastus soon left the band. Session drummers have since been recruited including Lille Grubber, Blastphemer (Jan Benkwitz) and former Belphegor drummer Torturer. That same month Nuclear Blast issued a special ammunition box variant of the Pestapokalypse VI album, limited to just 500 copies and packed with the CD in digipack, a patch, a belt and "emergency provisions". A vinyl version of the album was also restricted to 500 copies. Pestapokalypse VI was further promoted by a promotional videos for the songs Bluhtsturm Erotika and Belphegor - Hell's Ambassador directed by Florian Werner.

Belphegor were set to play the X-Mass Festival again in December 2006, however the festival was cancelled. Nevertheless, they were among the bands supporting Danzig on their Blackest of the Black tour in North America in December 2006 – January 2007, and they toured North America again in February–March 2007 with Unleashed, Krisiun, and Hatesphere. With support initially from Kataklysm and Unleashed and later from Arkhon Infaustus, Belphegor headlined the Midvinterblot European Tour Part II in May. The band also played at the famous Wacken Open Air festival in August. In September, the band coheadlined with Gorgoroth in most of the venues on the latter's tour of South America.

In January 2008, founding member Sigurd underwent eye surgery, and because of this it was not known whether he would resume with his role in Belphegor. A few months later however, Helmuth said Sigurd had chosen to leave the band permanently following their tour of Europe in late 2007. For Belphegor's North American tour in February 2008 he was replaced by Anthony Paulini, and he was eventually replaced by Morluch as full-time guitarist.

In April 2008, Bondage Goat Zombie was released featuring Helmuth on vocals and both lead and rhythm guitars, Serpenth on bass and Torturer on drums. As well as a standard CD release this album came in a variety of formats including a limited edition digipack complete with a DVD hosting video clips, behind the scenes footage, a studio "making of" documentary, live footage and a "freak" section, and a further limited option in Stahl helmet packaging complete with dogtag as well as a red vinyl version limited to 1000 copies. This was followed by an appearance at the Hellfest Summer Open Air festival in France in June 2008, and they supported Nile and Grave on the Ithyphallic tour of Europe in September 2008. In October 2008, the band once again toured North America with Amon Amarth.

Walpurgis Rites - Hexenwahn (2009–present)

In January 2009, an announcement was made stating the band was working on a new album, and Nefastus again would be responsible for the drums. It was reported recording had begun in February 2009, and Nefastus completed recording the drum parts. On 23 February 2009, Helmuth announced the rhythm guitar and bass lines had been recorded in the second studio session. Ostensibly, the new album was tentatively titled Hexenwahn - Totenkult:

As opposed to previous tales of the inquisition, this focuses upon the darker, more dismal of the mighty, powerful witches who conjure and worship demons. Those who have a pact with the forces of hell through the occult. The concept deals with demonology, witchcraft/ Hexenwahn, depraved suKKubi, blackest erotica, and as always, the grand devil, himself.

On 9 June 2009, the album's title was revealed to be Walpurgis Rites - Hexenwahn. On 3 July 2009, it was announced that the recording was completed and that the album would be released in October 2009. Furthermore, Brazilian artist Marcelo Hvc commenced work on the album cover and imagery.

The band embarked on another North American tour in April 2009, which was headlined by Kreator and Exodus, along with Warbringer and Epicurean.

In November 2009, the band joined the Heathenfest tour in North America, along with Eluveitie, Alestorm, Kivimetsän Druidi, and Vreid.
In December 2009, the band played in South America with Obituary.

On 14 January 2011 Belphegor released another album entitled Blood Magick Necromance and toured the US with Sepultura in support of the album.

The band was on hold after their 2011 South American tour until May 2012 due to Lehner going through a serious and difficult operation after being infected with typhoid fever.

On 23 August 2014, the band performed at the Agglutination Metal Festival in Italy, along with bands like Carcass and Entombed A.D.

Belphegor released their tenth album, "Conjuring The Dead", on 8 August 2014 via Nuclear Blast. It entered the official German charts at #60, as well as reaching #33 in the Austrian album charts, #177 in France, #13 Heatseekers #52 "Hard Music" charts in USA and #58 in Canada. It was their best chart result ever in these countries.

Before Belphegor's show in St. Petersburg, the band's leader Helmuth Lehner was attacked by Anatoly Artyukh, an orthodox activist and the assistant of the deputy Vitaly Milonov. The incident happened at the Pulkovo Airport on 19 April 2016.

The band released their eleventh album, Totenritual, on 15 September 2017.

In April 2022, the band announced their twelfth album, The Devils, would be released on 24 June. The album's release date was then pushed back twice due to manufacturing delays: once for 8 July, and then to 29 July.

Members

 Current members
 Helmuth Lehner - guitars (1991–present), lead vocals (1996-present)
 Serpenth - bass, backing vocals (2006–present)

 Current Live Members
 Martin "Molokh" Arzberger - guitars (2015-2016, 2020–present)
 James Stewart - drums (2021–present)

 Former members
 Maxx - bass, lead vocals (1991–1996)
 Chris - drums (1991–1996)
 Sigurd Hagenauer - guitars (1991–2007)
 Mario "Marius" Klausner - bass, backing vocals (1996–2001)
 Bartholomäus "Barth" Resch - bass, backing vocals (2002–2006)
 Tomasz "Nefastus" Janiszewski - drums (2005–2006)
 Morluch - guitars (2008–2009)
 Simon "BloodHammer" Schilling - drums (2015–2018)

 Former live members
 A-X - bass (1993–1996)
 Robin Eaglestone - bass (2006)
 Jan "Blastphemer" Benkwitz - drums (2006)
 Lille Gruber - drums (2007)
 Tony Laureano - drums (2007)
 Robert Kovačič - drums (2007–2009)
 Anthony Paulini - guitars (2008, 2010)
 Bernd "Bernth" Brodträger - guitars (2010–2011)
 Oli Beaudoin - drums (2011)
 Bartholomäus "Barth" Resch - vocals (2012)
 Schoft - guitars, backing vocals (2013–2014)
 Sascha "Impaler" - guitars, backing vocals (2015–2018)
 Ricardo "Horus" Falcon - guitars (2018–2020)
 Eugene "Ravager" Ryabchenko - drums (2018–2020)
 Pawel Jaroszewicz - drums (2019–2020)

 Session musicians
 Tomasz "Nefastus" Janiszewski - drums (2008–2009)
 Martin "Marthyn" Jovanović - drums (2009–2015)
 Florian "Torturer" Klein - drums (2000–2005, 2006–2008)
 Man Gandler - drums (1996–2000)

Timeline

Discography

Studio albums

EPs

Live albums

Videos

References

External links

Official Facebook
Official website
Belphegor at MySpace
Metal Archives

1991 establishments in Austria
Austrian black metal musical groups
Austrian death metal musical groups
Austrian heavy metal musical groups
Blackened death metal musical groups
Musical groups established in 1991
Musical quartets
Nuclear Blast artists